Dibrova, formerly known as Kabany, Kaganovichi, and Kaganovichi Drugi, is an abandoned settlement and former village in the Chernobyl Exclusion Zone, part of Kyiv Oblast, Ukraine. It was resettled due to the Chernobyl disaster and deregistered in 1999.

History
After the nuclear disaster of 26 April 1986, Dibrova was abandoned and in 1999, it was taken out of a registry as it was completely depopulated being located in the Zone of Alienation.

Dibrova was previously located in Poliske Raion until was abolished on 18 July 2020 as part of the administrative reform of Ukraine, which reduced the number of raions of Kyiv Oblast to seven. The area of Poliske Raion was merged into Vyshhorod Raion.

From February to April 2022, Dibrova was occupied by Russia as a result of the 2022 invasion.

Notable people
Lazar Kaganovich (1893 – 1991), politician

See also
Chernobyl Nuclear Power Plant

References 

Villages in Vyshhorod Raion
Ghost towns in the Chernobyl Exclusion Zone
Populated places disestablished in 1986
1986 disestablishments in Ukraine